Rugby League 2: World Cup Edition, a content update, was released exclusively on PlayStation 2 on 6 November 2008.  It is available primarily in Australia, New Zealand and the UK. Limited quantities of the game are also available in other PAL territories.

New features
All New World Cup Mode
Squad and Jersey updates for the NRL, Super League and World Cup International Teams
Addition on new NRL franchise Gold Coast Titans, including play likeness
Stadiums up to date and five New stadiums: 
Skilled Park, Gold Coast
Browne Park, Rockhampton
New Craven Park, Kingston upon Hull
Twickenham Stoop, Twickenham
Stade Gilbert Brutus, Perpignan
New in-game cut scenes
New Twilight NRL Grand Final stadiums
Unlockable NRL team heritage jerseys
Updated commentary by Andrew Voss

See also

Rugby League (video game series)

References

2008 video games
PlayStation 2 games
PlayStation 2-only games
Rugby league video games
Video games developed in New Zealand
Video games set in Australia
Video games set in England
Video games set in France
Video games set in New Zealand
Multiplayer and single-player video games
Sidhe (company) games
Tru Blu Entertainment games